Civo is a comune (municipality) in the Province of Sondrio in the Italian region Lombardy, located about 60 Miles(95 km) northeast of Milan and about 15 Miles (24 km)west of Sondrio. As of 31 December 2004, it had a population of 1,052 and an area of 25.2 km².

It is the most typical municipality of the Costiera dei Cèch,  famous for its Cincètt (little chapel on the pedestrian woodroads), wine terrasses, and its Nebbiolo red wine, dry stonewalls(Unesco) and also the typical rustical stonehouses on the border of the chestnut woods often with very old colourful fresks.

Civo borders the following municipalities: Ardenno, Dazio, Mello, Morbegno, Novate Mezzola, Traona, Val Masino.

Demographic evolution

References

Cities and towns in Lombardy